Muhammad Faizzudin bin Mohd Abidin (born 26 May 1996) is a Malaysian footballer who plays as a winger.

Club career

Selangor
Born in Kuala Lumpur, Malaysia, Faizzudin began his professional footballing career with Selangor Under-17 in 2010.  His form at youth level for the club saw him attract interest from Malaysia Super League sides Sarawak, but he elected to sign for Selangor's youth system in 2014, aged 17. Faizzudin made his senior debut with the Selangor's Academy side in January 2013. Faizzudin spent most of the season with Selangor President's Cup team, however, and enjoyed a successful 2013–16 campaign which earned him a permanent promotion to the first team side in 2017.

Faizzudin made his first team debut on 6 August 2016, coming on as a substitute in an away defeat to Kedah in the league matches.

Penang (loan)

On 10 October 2019, Faizzudin signed with Penang on a season-loan deal.

International career

On 25 August 2016, Faizzudin was called up to the Malaysia U-21 for Nations Cup Tournament under-21 in 2016.

Career statistics

Club

1 Includes AFC Cup and AFC Champions League.

References

External links
 Profile at faselangor.my

1996 births
Living people
Malaysian footballers
Selangor FA players
Malaysia Super League players
Malaysian people of Malay descent
Association football midfielders